The Voyage of the Mimi is a thirteen-episode American educational television program depicting the crew of the ship Mimi exploring the ocean and taking a census of humpback whales. The series aired on PBS (Public Broadcasting Service) and was created by the Bank Street College of Education in 1984 to teach middle-schoolers about science and mathematics in an interesting and interactive way, where every lesson related to real world applications.

The series was also released on VHS and as a LaserDisc collection. In August 2014, the series was released in digital form via iTunes U.

Format
After a segment of a fictional adventure in the first part of each episode, a corresponding "expedition documentary" taught viewers something scientific relating to plot events in the previous episode of the show. For example, there is an episode where the plot is about obtaining drinkable water, and over the course of the episode, the viewer is also given lessons about condensation, heat, and the three states of matter. Each lesson has accompanying student and teacher handouts or worksheets. Four software modules are available that covered topics and skills in navigation and map reading, computer literacy and programming, the elements of ecosystems, and the natural environment of whales.

The Voyage of the Mimi was shot in Marblehead, Massachusetts with some scenes being shot on Dyer Island, Maine. It marked Ben Affleck's television debut role.

A second series was produced in 1988, The Second Voyage of the Mimi, in which the two Granvilles, along with other archaeologists, searched for a lost Mayan city and uncovered a conspiracy along the way. Both series emphasized equal opportunity in math and science with a diverse cast (including race, gender, and disability status) and incorporated an instructional strategy wherein the fictionalized adventure would catch the interest of students for the initial part of the learning process. A third series, which would have been about the Mississippi River, including the river's biology and history, was planned but was not made due to an inability to obtain funding.

Cast
Ben Affleck played C.T. Granville and Peter G. Marston played his grandfather Captain Granville. Marston was a scientist at Massachusetts Institute of Technology during the production of the program and also the owner of the actual Mimi at the time.

Cast Listing:
Ben Affleck as Clement Tyler (C.T.) Granville
Peter G. Marston as Captain Clement Tyler Granville
Edwin De Asis as Ramon Rojas
Victoria Gadsden as Anne Abrams
Mark Graham as Arthur Spencer
Judy Pratt as Sally Ruth Cochran
Mary Tanner as Rachel Fairbanks

Film Crew Listing:

 D'Arcy Marsh, Director and Cinematographer
Barbara Hanania, Assistant Cinematographer
Roger Haydock, Gaffer
Eric Taylor, Sound

Episodes
Each episode consists of two fifteen-minute segments: the fictional story of the voyage of the Mimi, then an expedition that reveals the science behind the storyline explored in the episode.

The first segment of each episode follows a serialized tale of scientists taking a census of humpback whales off the coast of Massachusetts. Captain Clement Tyler Granville, the owner of the sailboat Mimi is hired by scientist Anne Abrams and her colleague Ramon Rojas to make the census. Anne's Graduate Research Assistant is Sally Ruth Cochran. In addition, the two scientists each invite a high school student (Arthur Spencer and Rachel Fairbanks) to take part in the study. Finally, Captain Granville's identically named grandson comes visiting for the summer in order to give his mother a break during her pregnancy.

Each second segment is a standalone exploration of one of the scientific principles touched on in the serialized tale. In these segments, an actor (Ben Affleck, Mark Graham, or Mary Tanner) portraying a young person comes out of character and interviews a real, in many cases well-known, scientist about his or her work. These scientists include oceanographer Sylvia Earle, geologist Kim Kastens, zoologist Katharine Payne, Greg Watson of the New Alchemy Institute, and physicist Ted Taylor.

In addition, Judy Pratt, a deaf student at Gallaudet University, and Peter Marston, a scientist at M.I.T., come out of character in interviews with Mary Tanner and Ben Affleck at their respective workplaces.

The real Mimi

Beginnings
She was built in northwest France in the region of Brittany, on the coast of the Mer d'Iroise (the Iroise Sea). Mimi is a type of vessel known as a "Gabare d'Iroise," where "Gabare" translates as "cargo barge" and "Iroise" refers to the region in which she was constructed.

Mimi was initially used as a cargo ship in the rough waters of the North Sea, and was thus built to withstand serious maritime conditions. Because Mimi was a "gabare," she was also built with a shallow draft. This combination of strength and ability to operate in shallow waters allowed Mimi to be used both in the open sea and the extensive canal system in Europe at that time.

After serving many years in the Northern part of France, Mimi was sold to an owner in the Southern part of France where she was converted to a fishing trawler for tunafish.

Nazi commandeer, sinking and salvage
The Mimi was used by German soldiers during the Second World War to transport munitions. In 1942, the Germans seized the Mimi for the purpose of transporting supplies to military outposts in the region of the Brittany coast. When the Allied Forces pushed the retreating Axis forces back eastward through France in August 1944, Nazi protocol was to destroy any military property that might possibly be used against them by the invading forces (i.e. fortresses, ammunition, vehicles, etc.) For reasons unknown, Mimi was not destroyed by retreating Nazi forces, but rather left tied to a tree on a mudflat. 

After the war the Mimi was sunk, and remained so until the 1960s when a Frenchman and his family bought it and converted it from a trawler to a sailboat.

Television career
By 1984, the Mimi had a new owner, Peter Marston. The boat was kept moored in Gloucester, Massachusetts, throughout the filming of the series and thereafter. In addition to its role in "The Voyage of the Mimi," which began in 1984, the boat was used from the late 1980s through the 1990s to teach schoolchildren using the Mimi curriculum. Each school year, the Mimi sailed from New England to the Gulf of Mexico and back, stopping at pre-arranged ports of call to meet with students in grades 4 through 7, and their teachers. At each port, "Mimifests" were held, which included various activities and presentations about marine life, seamanship, and navigation. These events were attended by approximately 30,000 students each year. In 1988, Peter Marston and other freelance musicians produced a cassette, Sea Songs from the Mimi Crew, of old-time sea songs self-published under the name "The Barn School" based in Gloucester, Massachusetts. Other souvenirs were also available from the sailing vessel Mimi such as T-shirts and buttons reading "I was on board the Mimi".
The souvenirs are no longer manufactured, and are even difficult to find within the online resale market.
Marston retained ownership of the vessel until 1998, when the boat was sold to new owners Captain George G. Story of Gloucester, Massachusetts, his brother Captain Alan M. Story of Deltona, Florida, and Spiro "Steve" Cocotas, also from Gloucester. They operated the vessel as Three Mates Inc. for several years, bringing the boat to as many as 28 cities along the east coast.

Beginning of the end
After years of ownership under Three Mates Inc., Mimi was repossessed for financial reasons and sold at public auction in Massachusetts. Michael Spurgeon developed a plan to resurrect the Mimi, and the vessel was subsequently purchased with venture capital provided by Spurgeon's employer, Capt. Greg Muzzy, a Boston-area entrepreneur who owns and operates the "Liberty Fleet of Tall Ships,". Mimi was sailed from Gloucester to the Mystic River in Boston, where she was kept docked at various marinas in East Boston and Chelsea.

Spurgeon's intention was to rehabilitate the ship and possibly court a Discovery Channel special about Mimi's story. After spending approximately $100,000 on infrastructural investments on the ship, including a complete rebuild of the stern and diesel engine, the ship became too costly to continue work on.

In 2008, it was discovered that a homeless man had been living aboard the ship while docked at the marina, and he was promptly kicked out. In an act of revenge, the man returned and removed one of several plugs in the belly of the ship, allowing her to rapidly fill with water. Mimi sank while at port, effectively ruining all electronics aboard the ship as well as seriously damaging the recently rebuilt engine. A significant amount of damage occurred above the keel of the ship due to freshwater clams colonizing the wood while she was underwater, rendering restoration nearly impossible.

She was floated back to the surface by a recovery team two weeks later, and sat disused after that.

Attempted revival and final disposal
In the summer of 2010, two recent college graduates of the University of Vermont who had been fans of The Voyage of the Mimi stumbled upon the Mimi at port and mounted an effort to save the ship, which had fallen into a state of disrepair.  Their efforts ultimately proved unsuccessful, given among other factors the high cost that would be required to save the ship and the Mimi's limited historical value, so the Mimi was scrapped in July 2011.

References

External links
 

1984 American television series debuts
1984 American television series endings
PBS original programming
Science education television series